Robert "Bobby" Bowie Owens (October 29, 1870 – November 3, 1940) was a U.S. electrical engineer. He was the director of the Maryland Academy of Science. He was secretary of Franklin Institute from 1910 to 1924. He is credited as a discoverer of the alpha ray.

Biography
He was born October 29, 1870. Owens was a graduate of the Industrial College of Johns Hopkins University and Columbia University.

On August 19, 1891 he was employed as an adjunct professor in electrical engineering in the newly formed school of Electrical Engineering at the University of Nebraska. After seven years of service he left the now-department in shape comparable to other universities of the time, in August 1898, Owens took a position as MacDonald Chair of Electrical Engineering at McGill University in Montreal.

During his time at Nebraska, Owens was involved in forming The Society of Electrical Engineers of the University of Nebraska in 1893, the body which is known today as the IEEE.

Owens served as an officer in World War I, alongside General John J. Pershing.

He died on November 3, 1940.

References

External links
 History of the Electrical Engineering Department, University of Nebraska

External links

1870 births
1940 deaths
American electrical engineers
United States Army personnel of World War I
Johns Hopkins University alumni
Columbia University alumni
Fellows of the American Physical Society
Discoverers of chemical elements